This is an episode list for the Tenchi Muyo! series, which started on 25 September 1992 in Japan. The series was created by Masaki Kajishima, produced by AIC and distributed by Pioneer LDC/Geneon, VAP, and Funimation Entertainment.

Tenchi Muyo! Ryo-Ohki

Season 1
{|class="wikitable" width="98%"
|- style="border-bottom: 3px solid #CCF"
! width="30" | # !! Original Video Animation !! width="150" | Original airdate !! US airdate
|-

|}

Season 1 Special

{|class="wikitable" width="98%"
|- style="border-bottom: 3px solid #CCF"
! width="30" | # !! Title !! width="150" | Original airdate !! US airdate
|-

|}

Season 2

{|class="wikitable" width="98%"
|- style="border-bottom: 3px solid #CCF"
! width="30" | # !! Original Video Animation !! width="150" | Original airdate !! US airdate
|-

|}

Season 3

Note: The English title used in FUNimation Entertainment's Region 1 release of the series appears first, followed by the original kana/kanji and romaji. Where applicable, a more literal translation of the original title appears after the romaji.
{|class="wikitable" width="98%"
|- style="border-bottom: 3px solid #CCF"
! width="30" | # !! Original Video Animation !! width="150" | Original airdate !! US airdate
|-

|}

Season 3 Special
{|class="wikitable" width="98%"
|- style="border-bottom: 3px solid #CCF"
! width="30" | # !! Title !! width="150" | Original airdate !! US airdate
|-

|}

Season 4

{|class="wikitable" width="98%"
|-
!style="background: #CCF" width="2%"|#
!style="background: #CCF"|Original Video Animation
!style="background: #CCF" width="15%"|Original Airdate
|-

|}

Season 5

{|class="wikitable" width="98%"
|-
!style="background: #CCF" width="2%"|#
!style="background: #CCF"|Original Video Animation
!style="background: #CCF" width="15%"|Original Airdate
|-

|}

Tenchi Universe

Earth Adventure ["Chikyū-hen" (地球篇)] (Episodes 1-10)

{|class="wikitable" width="98%"
|- style="border-bottom: 3px solid #CCF"
! width="30" | # !! Spin-Offs !! width="150" | Original airdate !! US airdate
|-

|}

Time and Space Adventures ["Tokubetsu Kōgyō" (特別興行)] (Episodes 11-13)
These episodes are an adaptation of the drama CD, Tenchi Muyo! Special: Creation of the Universe Journey across Space-Time, with the exception of Ayeka's tale, which was created for episode 11. The latter tale was supposed to be on the aforementioned CD, but was cut out due to time constraints.

{|class="wikitable" width="98%"
|- style="border-bottom: 3px solid #CCF"
! width="30" | # !! Title !! width="150" | Original airdate !! US airdate
|-

|}

Space Adventure ["Uchū-hen" (宇宙篇)] (Episodes 14-26)
{|class="wikitable" width="98%"
|- style="border-bottom: 3px solid #CCF"
! width="30" | # !! Title !! width="150" | Original airdate !! US airdate
|-

|}

Tenchi in Tokyo

{|class="wikitable" width="98%"
|- style="border-bottom: 3px solid #CCF"
! width="30" | # !! Spin-Offs !! width="150" | Original airdate !! US airdate
|-

|}

Tenchi Muyo! GXP

Tenchi Muyo! War on Geminar

Ai Tenchi Muyo!

Movies
Tenchi the Movie: Tenchi Muyo in Love
Tenchi the Movie 2: The Daughter of Darkness
Tenchi Muyo!: Galaxy Police Mihoshi Space Adventure
Tenchi Forever! The Movie